was the thirteenth of twenty-four s, built for the Imperial Japanese Navy following World War I. When introduced into service, these ships were the most powerful destroyers in the world. They served as first-line destroyers through the 1930s, and remained formidable weapons systems well into the Pacific War.

History
Construction of the advanced Fubuki-class destroyers was authorized as part of the Imperial Japanese Navy's expansion program from fiscal 1923, intended to give Japan a qualitative edge with the world's most modern ships. The Fubuki class had performance that was a quantum leap over previous destroyer designs, so much so that they were designated . The large size, powerful engines, high speed, large radius of action and unprecedented armament gave these destroyers the firepower similar to many light cruisers in other navies. Asagiri, built at the Sasebo Naval Arsenal was the eighth in an improved series, which incorporated a modified gun turret which could elevate her main battery of Type 3 127 mm 50 caliber naval guns to 75° as opposed to the original 40°, thus permitting the guns to be used as dual purpose guns against aircraft. Asagiri was laid down on 12 December 1928, launched on 18 November 1929 and commissioned on 30 June 1930. Originally assigned hull designation “Destroyer No. 47”, she was named Asagiri, after that of a previous  before her launch.

Operational history
In 1932, after the First Shanghai Incident, Asagiri was assigned to patrols of the Yangtze River. In 1935, after the Fourth Fleet Incident, in which a large number of ships were damaged by a typhoon, she, along with her sister ships, were modified with stronger hulls and increased displacement. From 1937, Asagiri covered landing of Japanese forces in Shanghai and Hangzhou during the Second Sino-Japanese War. From 1940, she was assigned to patrol and cover landings of Japanese forces in south China, and subsequently participated in the Invasion of French Indochina.

World War II history
At the time of the attack on Pearl Harbor, Asagiri was assigned to Destroyer Division 20 of Desron 3 of the IJN 1st Fleet, and had deployed from Kure Naval District to the port of Samah on Hainan Island, escorting Japanese troopships for landing operations in the Battle of Malaya.

At the end of February, Asagiri covered minesweeping operations around Singapore and Johore.

In March, Asagiri was assigned to "Operation L" (the invasion of northern Sumatra) and "Operation D" (the invasion of the Andaman Islands). From 13–22 April Asagiri returned via Singapore and Camranh Bay to Kure Naval Arsenal, for maintenance.

On 4–5 June, Asagiri participated in the Battle of Midway as was part of the diversionary Aleutian Invasion force. In July 1942, Asagiri sailed from Amami-Ōshima to Mako Guard District, Singapore, Sabang and Mergui for a projected second Indian Ocean raid. The operation was cancelled due to the Guadalcanal campaign, and Asagiri was ordered to Truk instead, arriving in late August.

After the Battle of the Eastern Solomons on 24 August, Asagiri took on troops from transport ships while at sea, and sailed on to Guadalcanal. During this operation, she was struck by a direct hit by a bomb on her torpedo launchers by United States Marine Corps SBD Dauntless dive bombers from Henderson Field.

On 1 October 1942, Asagiri was removed from the navy list.

Notes

References

External links

Fubuki-class destroyers
Ships built by Sasebo Naval Arsenal
1929 ships
Second Sino-Japanese War naval ships of Japan
World War II destroyers of Japan
Destroyers sunk by aircraft
Shipwrecks in Ironbottom Sound
Maritime incidents in August 1942
Ships sunk by US aircraft